Lesbian, gay, bisexual and transgender  (LGBT) people in Mozambique face legal challenges not faced by non-LGBT people. Same-sex sexual activity became legal in Mozambique under the new Criminal Code that took effect in June 2015. Discrimination based on sexual orientation in employment has been illegal since 2007.

Mozambique, along with other former Portuguese colonies, is one of the most LGBT-friendly African nations. Polls have found moderate levels of support for LGBT rights and same-sex marriage. Nevertheless, same-sex couples are unable to marry or adopt, and LGBT people still face discrimination and prejudice.

Legality of same-sex sexual activity
Until the enactment of the new Criminal Code, the legal status of same-sex sexual activity was ambiguous in Mozambique. In March 2011, the Minister of Justice declared during the UN Human Rights Council's Universal Periodic Review that homosexuality is not an offence in Mozambique. However, the Criminal Code did contain an offence of "practices against nature". According to the ILGA, Articles 70 and 71(4°) provided for the imposition of security measures on people who habitually practiced "acts against nature". The security measures included a bond of "good behaviour", being put on probation for a certain period, or even internment in a workhouse or agricultural colony (from six months to three years).

In December 2014, President Armando Guebuza signed the new Criminal Code, which does not contain any provisions regarding same-sex sexual activity, into law. It was published in the country's official journal on 31 December 2014 and took effect 180 days later (i.e. 30 June 2015).

Recognition of same-sex relationships
Mozambique does not provide any form of recognition of same-sex relationships, though protests for same-sex marriage and common-law marriage have been ongoing since 2006.

Discrimination protections
In line with most other former Portuguese African colonies, Mozambique is reported to be one of the most tolerant countries in Africa towards gays and lesbians. While the Government has reported fairly little on LGBT rights, all of what has been said has been positive. It is one of the only few countries in Africa to offer any form of discrimination protections for gay, lesbians and bisexuals, which have been in place since 2007. Protests for such legislation had been kickstarted only a year before, signaling a reasonably swift response by the Government.

Article 4 of the 23/2007 Labour Law provides for "non-discrimination on grounds of sexual orientation, race or HIV/AIDS status". Article 5 of the law grants employees a right to privacy, relating to "the private and personal lives of employees, such as their family lives, personal relationships, sex lives, state of health and their political and religious convictions." Article 108 of the law provides that "all employees, whether nationals or foreigners, without distinction based on sex, sexual orientation, ... have the right to receive a wage and to enjoy equal benefits for equal work".

Public opinion
A September 2013 survey of people in the cities of Maputo, Beira and Nampula found moderate levels of support for the legal recognition of same-sex couples and parenting rights:

A 2016 Afrobarometer opinion poll found that 56% of Mozambicans would welcome or would not be bothered by having a homosexual neighbor. Mozambique was one of the only four countries polled with a majority in favor. (the others being Cape Verde (74%), South Africa (67%) and Namibia (55%))

According to a 2017 poll carried out by ILGA, 61% of Mozambicans agreed that gay, lesbian and bisexual people should enjoy the same rights as straight people, while 23% disagreed. Additionally, 66% agreed that they should be protected from workplace discrimination. 32% of Mozambicans, however, said that people who are in same-sex relationships should be charged as criminals, while a plurality of 43% disagreed. As for transgender people, 66% agreed that they should have the same rights, 68% believed they should be protected from employment discrimination and 55% believed they should be allowed to change their legal gender.

A 2017 survey of people in the cities of Maputo, Beira and Nampula again found moderate levels of support for LGBT rights. Support for same-sex marriage increased in all three cities to 47% in Maputo, 38% in Beira and 42% in Nampula. Support for same-sex adoption was 33% in Maputo, 43% in Beira and 42% in Nampula. In addition, the survey also found that 85% opposed violence against LGBT people and would come to help them if they were being physically assaulted. However, most respondents said they would not accept their child if he/she came out (with 28% of Beira respondents stating they would assault their child if he/she was gay). 37.5% would react negatively if a co-worker came out, while 37.9% would accept them and 20.6% would be indifferent. Furthermore, about one-third stated that they personally knew an openly LGBT person, and two-thirds said they would not want a gay president.

Living conditions
Hate crimes and violence directed at the LGBT community are rare in Mozambique, unlike in some other African countries. However, discrimination is not unheard of.

A notable figure to have spoken out in support of LGBT rights in Mozambique and the rest of Africa is former President Joaquim Chissano who also spoke to other African leaders to stop laws that impede on LGBT rights in Africa.

NGO registration
Lambda Mozambique, a local civil society organisation advocating on issues of sexual and gender rights, has requested to register as a non-governmental organization since 2008. A process which usually lasts six weeks. In 2010, after being ignored by the Ministry of Justice for two years, the group took their case to the United Nations, appealing to the High Commission for Human Rights to act on the violation of their right to association. The UN Human Rights Council had been calling on Mozambique to register Lambda since 2011.

In October 2017, the Constitutional Council of Mozambique declared that Article 1 of Law No. 8/91 (which allowed the registration of associations in the country in accordance with the principles of "moral order") was unconstitutional. The reference to "moral order" was deemed incompatible with article 53(3) of the Mozambican Constitution of 2004, which only forbids the registration of military associations or those that promote violence, racism or xenophobia.

Summary table

See also

LGBT rights in Africa
LGBT rights in the Commonwealth of Nations
Human rights in Africa

References

Mozambique
LGBT in Mozambique
Law of Mozambique
LGBT